What a Wonderful Time is the tenth studio album by American singer Yolanda Adams. Her second Christmas album and only record to be released by Columbia Records, it was issued on October 17, 2007. What a Wonderful Time consists of ten tracks, featuring five original songs and five cover versions of Christmas standards and carols.

Track listing

Charts

Release history

References

Yolanda Adams albums
Christmas albums by American artists
Columbia Records Christmas albums
2007 Christmas albums
Gospel Christmas albums
Albums produced by Michael J. Powell